William Horsley (6 June 1835 – 29 August 1864) was an English cricketer. Horsley's batting style is unknown. He was born at Southwell, Nottinghamshire.

Horsley made two first-class appearances for Nottinghamshire in 1862, against Cambridgeshire at Fenner's and Surrey at The Oval. He scored 31 runs in his two matches, with a high score of 16.

He died at the town of his birth on 29 August 1864.

References

External links
William Horsley at ESPNcricinfo
William Horsley at CricketArchive

1835 births
1864 deaths
People from Southwell, Nottinghamshire
Cricketers from Nottinghamshire
English cricketers
Nottinghamshire cricketers